At different times in its history, Washington elected one or more U.S. Representatives at-large statewide.

From statehood in 1889 until 1909, Washington elected all of its U.S. representatives statewide. In 1909, Washington was divided into congressional districts for purposes of electing representatives.

Following the 1950 Census, Washington was granted a seventh seat in the U.S. House of Representatives, but the state legislature was unable to agree on a plan to create a geographic district for the seat until 1957, so the seat was filled by a representative elected statewide.

From statehood in 1889 to 1893, Washington elected one representative at-large statewide.

From 1893 to 1903, Washington elected two representatives at-large statewide, then added a third seat in 1903. The third seat at large continued until 1909, when all representatives were elected from districts.

From 1913 to 1915, Washington elected two representatives at-large statewide, with the remaining three representatives elected from districts.

From 1953 to 1959, Washington elected one representative at-large statewide, with the remaining six representatives elected from districts.

After 1959, all representatives were elected from districts.

List of representatives

References 

 Congressional Biographical Directory of the United States 1774–present

At-large
Former congressional districts of the United States
At-large United States congressional districts